The Belgrade Phantom is a Serbian historical, drama, thriller and documentary film directed by Jovan Todorović. It was released in 2009.

This film combines archival television footage, and current interviews with witnesses and participants of the events from 1979, as well as acting scenes.

Plot
The film is about Vlada Vasiljević, a citizen of Belgrade, that in 1979 stole a white Porsche 911 Targa S, and then, for about ten evenings drove the police crazy with his reckless driving to the Slavija Square. During an official visit of the president Tito to Cuba in 1979, the attention of the capital was directed to the Phantom in the white Porsche. The Mysterious driver that drove like crazy in a stolen car over the square Slavija made in the midnight hours a real spectacle, constantly managed to get away from the police. Over the radio he openly called the police to catch him, which was the first oppositional act in the post-war Yugoslavia. Several tens of thousand people went on the streets to support him.

Cast 
 Marko Živić - Fandjo
 Radoslav Milenković - Maksic
 Milutin Milošević - Phantom
 Nada Macanković - Djina
 Andrej Šepetkovski - Boza
 Aleksandar Đurica - Ivko Plećević
 Miloš Samolov - Cvele
 Goran Radaković - Komarac
 Bojan Lazarov - Ilija Bogdanović

External links
 

2000s Serbian-language films
2009 films
2000s chase films
Films set in Belgrade
Films set in Serbia
Films set in Yugoslavia
2000s thriller films
Films shot in Belgrade
Cultural depictions of Josip Broz Tito
Cultural depictions of Serbian men
Films about the Serbian Mafia
Serbian drama films